Freddie Ravel is an American keyboardist,  keynote speaker, author, composer and recording artist.

Ravel served as the musical director as well as composer, producer and concert touring keyboardist of the band Earth, Wind & Fire. He's also worked with a broad range of music icons spanning the genres of Latin, R&B, Pop, Hip Hop, Country, Jazz and World Music. These include: Sergio Mendes, Flora Purim, Kanye West, Madonna, Stevie Wonder, Sheryl Crow, Bobby McFerrin, Al Jarreau, Khaled, and Prince and the teams behind Dr. Martin Luther King Jr, Deepak Chopra, J Lo and Lady Gaga.

Biography
Ravel was born and bred in Los Angeles to a Ukranian-German-Polish father and a Colombian mother. He started playing the accordion at the age of 7 then moved on to play the drums, guitar and eventually the piano. He later received his Bachelor's Degree in Music graduating with cum laude honors from California State University.

Ravel began performing around the world at age 23 with Brazilian icon Sergio Mendes where he was later signed by Universal Records. This led to a series of three sensual and fiery albums: Midnight Passion, Sol to Soul and Freddie Ravel which charted #1 in the USA and have garnered critical acclaim with the Los Angeles Times describing his music as "a masterful blend of jazz textures, rock energy and tropical rhythms and guitar legend Carlos Santana describing it as "pura corazon".

During 1988 Ravel became the musical director for Indian violinist L. Subramaniam. Within the following year he became a member of Sergio Mendes's band. Ravel went on to join Earth, Wind & Fire in 1992 as the band's musical director. He thus played on their 1993 album Millennium. He also featured on Flora Purim's 1994 album Speed of Light. After four years with EWF he went on perform with Madonna on the soundtrack of the 1996 feature film Evita. He also played on Peter White's 1997 LP Songs of the Season. During 1998 Ravel became the musical director of Jazz musician Al Jarreau. He went on to produce Jarreau on his 2000 album Tomorrow Today. The album rose to No. 2 on the Billboard Jazz Albums chart.

Ravel later performed and co-wrote on Jarreau's 2002 album All I Got. He then played on Euge Groove's 2002 LP Play Date and Earth, Wind and Fire's 2003 album The Promise. Ravel also composed on Jarreau's 2004 album, Accentuate The Positive, and performed and co-wrote the song "Givin' It Up" on the double Grammy-Award winning 2006 album by Al Jarreau and George Benson titled by the same name as the song, Givin' It Up.

Ravel’s speaking and music careers would merge in 1997 to create the first ever music-applied-to-behavior system called "Life in Tune". As a featured author alongside Maya Angelou, Muhammad Ali, Robert Kennedy Jr. and Stevie Wonder, upon invitation directly from Yolanda King, the eldest daughter of Dr. Martin Luther King Jr, Ravel wrote "The Artist in Us All" for the McGraw-Hill publication, Open My Eyes, Open My Soul.

On November 17, 2012, Ravel was officially knighted by the Knights of St. John, champions of hospitals and health care for the past 1000+ years. Ravel would later be dubbed the "Keynote Maestro" by the City of Los Angeles for "renewing the national and international economy" through his Life In Tune system, his clients include IBM, NASA, Google, Apple, Blue Cross, EY and Prudential calling his “ideal balance of Entertainment and Content” essential to transforming dissonance to harmony.

Discography
Solo albums:
 Midnight Passion (1991)
 Sol to Soul (1995)
 Freddie Ravel (2000)
 If Music Could Speak (2014)
Carlos Santana: Guitar Heaven (2010)
Earth, Wind & Fire: Millennium (1993)
Earth, Wind & Fire: The Promise (2003)
Robert Mitchum: Nice Girls Don't Stay for Breakfast (2018 documentary)
George Benson and Al Jarreau : Givin' It Up (2006)
Al Jarreau: Tomorrow Today (2000)
Al Jarreau: "Excellent Adventure" on The Very Best of Al Jarreau: An Excellent Adventure (2009)
Al Jarreau: All I Got (2002)
Peter White: Songs of the Season (1997)

References

Living people
American keyboardists
Musicians from Los Angeles
Earth, Wind & Fire members
Year of birth missing (living people)
Smooth jazz pianists
American producers
American male songwriters
American male composers
American motivational speakers